Bulgaria competed at the 2022 World Athletics Championships in Eugene, United States, from 15 to 24 July 2022. Bulgaria entered 1 athlete.

Results

Women

 Track and Field Events

References 

Nations at the 2022 World Athletics Championships
World Athletics Championships
2022